is a public university, in Yokohama, Kanagawa Prefecture, Japan. As of 2013, YCU has two faculties with a total of around 4,850 students, 111 of whom are foreign. YCU also has four campuses (Kanazawa-Hakkei, Fukuura, Maioka and Tsurumi) and two hospitals (YCU Hospital and YCU Medical Center). YCU is a member of the Port-City University League (PUL), and a core member of the Japanese University Network in the Bay Area (JUNBA). In 2017, YCU has been ranked #16th among "world's best small universities" in 2016-2017 (Times Higher Education), ranked at 23rd among life sciences institutes in Japan (Nature Index 2016).

History

From Yokohama School of Commerce to Yokohama City University 
In 1888, the school was renamed , a five-year school for boys (ages 14–19 or above). In 1917, Yokohama Commercial School was municipalized and in 1921 it became a seven-year commercial school (for ages 12–19 or above). The Ministry of Education urged the school to shorten the curriculum by two years, as Japanese Commercial School Regulations (1921) did not specify a seven-year course for commercial schools. In 1924, it became a five-year school with a two-year specialized course. In 1949, it was renamed Yokohama City Economics College and reorganized into Yokohama City University under Japan's new educational system.

From Juzen Hospital to Yokohama City University 
This hospital was municipalized in 1891. In 1944) was established, and Juzen Hospital became a college hospital. In 1947, after World War II, the medical college became , a municipal university. Its three-year preparatory course was established in 1947, and the four-year main course was established in 1949. In 1952, the medical school was merged with Yokohama City University.

From Yokohama City University College of Nursing
 was a public junior college in Kanazawa-ku, Yokohama, Japan. It opened in 1898 as a vocational school, and was amalgamated with the Yokohama City University School of Medicine in 2005.

Recent history 
In 1949, YCU had one faculty: the Faculty of Economics and Business Administration. In 1952, two faculties were added (School of Medicine and Faculty of Literature and Science). The subsequent history of YCU is as follows.

 1984: Kihara Institute for Biological Research (KIBR) was transferred to YCU.
 1995: Faculty of Literature and Science was reorganized into two faculties: Faculty of International Liberal Arts and Faculty of Science.
 2005: Three faculties (Faculty of Economics and Business Administration, Faculty of Sciences, and Faculty of Humanities and International Studies) were integrated. International College of Arts and Sciences was established.
 2005: Yokohama City University College of Nursing was transferred to YCU, and four-year Nursing Course was established.
 2005: The Graduate School of Economics, the Graduate School of Business Administration, the Graduate School of Integrated Science, and the Graduate School of International Cultural Studies were integrated. International Graduate School of Arts and Sciences was established.
 2006: Advanced Medical Research Center (AMRC) was established.
 2007: YCU California Office was established as a core member of Japanese University Network in the Bay Area (JUNBA) in Santa Clara, California.
 2009: International Graduate School of Arts and Sciences was reorganized and divided into the Graduate School of Urban Social and Cultural Studies, the Graduate School of Nanobioscience and the Graduate School of International Management.
 2011: Japan International Cooperation Agency (JICA) began the international project for the Development of Wheat Breeding Materials for Sustainable Food Production through KIBR.
 2012: Division of Global Urban and Regional Studies was established.
 2013: Graduate School of Medical Life Science was established.
 2014: YCU concluded a memorandum of understanding (MOU) relating to implementation of the “International College Program with Academic Training at Walt Disney World Resort” with Valencia College.
 2018: The School of Data Science was established.
 2019: International College of Arts and Sciences was reorganized and divided into School of International Liberal Arts, School of Economics and Business Administration, and School of Science.

Campuses

Kanazawa-Hakkei Campus 

The Kanazawa-Hakkei Campus in Kanazawa-ku, Yokohama is one of the main campuses of YCU. Yochy, the mascot of YCU is a ginkgo leaf, from the trees found throughout the campus. One of the university's landmarks, the clock tower, is on this campus.

Fukuura Campus 

The Fukuura Campus in Kanazawa-ku, Yokohama is one of the main campuses of YCU. It includes the YCU School of Medicine, Hospital, and Advanced Medical Research Center. It is connected to Shidai-Igakubu Station on the Yokohama Seaside Line. The Hepburn Hall is on this campus.

Maioka Campus 
The Maioka Campus in Totsuka-ku, Yokohama is home to Kihara Institute for Biological Research (KIBR).

Tsurumi Campus 

The Tsurumi Campus in Tsurumi-ku, Yokohama was established in 2001 as a graduate school partnership between YCU and RIKEN. RIKEN Yokohama researchers visit YCU as guest professors and provide guidance for students as part of a cooperative graduate school agreement.

Faculties (undergraduate schools)

School of International Liberal Arts 
 Department of International Liberal Arts

School of Economics and Business Administration 
 Department of Economics and Business Administration

School of Science 
 Department of Science

School of Data Science
 Department of Data Science

School of Medicine 
 Medical Course (six-year)
 Nursing Course (four-year)

International College of Arts and Sciences 
International College of Arts and Sciences will be reorganized and divided into School of International Liberal Arts, School of Economics and Business Administration, and School of Science in 2019.
 Division of Liberal Arts and International Studies
 Department of Human Science
 Department of Social Relations
 Department of Arts and Cultures
 Division of Global Urban and Regional Studies
 Department of Urban Planning and Community Development
 Department of Urban and Regional Policy
 Department of Global Cooperation and Area Studies
 Division of Economics and Business Administration
 Department of Business Administration
 Department of Accounting
 Department of Economics
 Division of Sciences
 Department of Materials Science
 Department of Life and Environmental Science
 Department of Medical Life Science

Graduate schools 
 Graduate School of Urban Social and Cultural Studies
 Degree conferred: Master of Arts, Doctor of Philosophy
 Graduate School of International Management
 Degree conferred: Master of Management, Master of Economics, Doctor of Business Administration, Doctor of Economics
Graduate School of Nanobioscience
 Degree conferred: Master of Science, Doctor of Science
 Graduate School of Medical Life Science
 Degree conferred: Master of Science, Doctor of Science
 Graduate School of Medicine

Joint graduate school of medicine program 
The YCU Graduate School of Medicine is engaged in "Joint Graduate School Programs" with various establishments include the following.

Kanagawa Cancer Center
Kanagawa Children's Medical Center
National Institute of Infectious Diseases
National Institute of Radiological Sciences
Pharmaceuticals and Medical Devices Agency
RIKEN
Yokohama National University

Research centers and institutes 
 Research Promotion Center
 Advanced Medical Research Center (AMRC)
 Kihara Institute for Biological Research (KIBR)

University hospitals

Yokohama City University Hospital 
The YCU Hospital in Kanazawa-ku, Yokohama has 654 beds, and in the 2012 fiscal year, treated 465,918 out-patients and 213,149 in-patients. The Hospital is a designated hospital as a Regional Cancer Care Hospital, AIDS Care Central Core Hospital and an approved as a Specific Function Hospital.

Yokohama City University Medical Center

International cooperation 
YCU has exchange agreements with the following universities.
University of California, San Diego
University of California, Los Angeles
University of Vienna
Incheon National University
Oxford Brookes University
Shanghai Normal University
Ca' Foscari University of Venice
University of Bucharest
Universiti Sains Malaysia
Vietnam National University, Ho Chi Minh City
University of the Philippines

Some graduate schools have engaged in joint research with the following African universities.
University of Zambia
University of Pretoria
University of Johannesburg
Makerere University
University of Malawi

Notable people

Alumni 
Masatoshi Ito - founder of Seven & I Holdings Co. and supporter of the Peter F. Drucker and Masatoshi Ito Graduate School of Management
Yoichi Nishimaru - physician and the author of 
Yoshiharu Sekino - surgeon and explorer famous for traveling "the Great Journey", tracing the route of mankind which spread from its origin in Africa to the Americas in reverse, starting at the southern tip of South America.
Takehiko Ogawa - urologist and developmental biologist famous for in vitro spermatogenesis.
Hase Seishū - novelist known for writing Yakuza crime fictions.
Ken Hirai - R&B and pop singer

Faculty 
Duane B. Simmons - American physician, educator and lay Christian missionary
Neil Gordon Munro - Scottish physician and anthropologist
Taikichiro Mori - economist and founder of Mori Building Company
Hiroshi Nakamura - biochemist and historian of cartography
Masayuki Kikuchi - seismologist famous for real-time seismology
Makoto Asashima - biologist and the discoverer of Activin
Kenji Kosaka - psychiatrist and the discoverer of Dementia with Lewy bodies
Shigeo Ohno - biochemist famous for pioneer research on cell polarity
Naomichi Matsumoto - geneticist known for identifying several causative genes for human diseases

Honorary doctoral degree recipients 
Honorary doctoral degree recipients include the following.
 Harold W. Kroto (November 4, 1997)
 Howard A. Bern (November 12, 1997) 
 Elizabeth Mann-Borgese (December 8, 1998) 
 Harold J.Simon (March 23, 1999)
 Yataro Tajima (October 31, 2001)
 Kenneth D. Butler (November 12, 2001) 
 Ma Ying-jeou (July 12, 2006)
 Masatoshi Ito (October 12, 2007)

See also 
 Yokohama City University College of Nursing

References

External links 
 
 Yokohama City University | JPSS for International Students

 
Educational institutions established in 1882
Public universities in Japan
1882 establishments in Japan
Universities and colleges in Yokohama